August Geiger may refer to:

 August Geiger (architect) (1888–1968), American architects in South Florida
 August Geiger (pilot) (1920–1943), German Luftwaffe night fighter ace